The 1988–89 Copa del Rey was the 87th staging of the Spanish Cup. The competition began on 31 August 1988 and concluded on 30 June 1989 with the final.

First round

|}

Second round

|}

Third round

|}

Round of 32

|}

Round of 16

|}

First leg

Second leg

Quarter-finals

|}

First leg

Second leg

Semi-finals

|}

First leg

Second leg

Final

|}

External links
 rsssf.com
 linguasport.com

Copa del Rey seasons
Copa del Rey
Copa del Rey
Copa del Rey